Richard Baylie (1585 – 27 July 1667) was twice President of St John's College, Oxford, twice Vice-Chancellor of Oxford University, Archdeacon of Nottingham and Dean of the Salisbury Cathedral.

Baylie was President of St John's College, Oxford from 1633 to 1648 and 1660 to 1667. He built the Baylie Chapel at the college in 1662. In 1635, he became Dean of Salisbury and tightened discipline there, but spent most of his time in Oxford. However, it is said that, when in Salisbury, he was — 'like a cardinal' — lavishly hospitable. In 1650 he bought Honingham Hall in Norfolk from the Richardson family. Baylie married Elizabeth, the daughter of William Robinson, the Archdeacon of Nottinghamshire, who was half-brother of the Archbishop of Canterbury, William Laud. He died on 27 July 1667.

References

1585 births
1667 deaths
Fellows of St John's College, Oxford
Presidents of St John's College, Oxford
Vice-Chancellors of the University of Oxford
Deans of Salisbury
Archdeacons of Nottingham
People from Honingham